Nao Hibino was the defending champion, but chose not to participate.

Alison Van Uytvanck won the title, defeating Anastasia Pivovarova in the final, 6–3, 3–6, 6–2.

Seeds

Main draw

Finals

Top half

Bottom half

References 
 Main draw

Stockton Challenger - Singles